Konstancja Czartoryska may refer to:

 Konstancja Czartoryska (1700–1759), Polish noblewoman
 Konstancja Czartoryska (1729–1749), Polish noblewoman, daughter of Michał Fryderyk Czartoryski
 Konstancja Czartoryska (1742–1797), Polish noblewoman, mother of Stanisław Kostka Zamoyski